Aldona is a village in the Taluka of Bardez in the Indian state of Goa. It is known for producing several prominent Goans.

Geography

Aldona, as a comunidade-village, comprises around 16 wards. Bodiem and Danua wards are separated from the main village area by the Mapusa river, and come under the neighboring village of Tivim's panchayat. Aldona comunidade's other wards are Quitula, Ranoi, Coimawaddo, Gutcoi, Udoi, Cottarbhat, Santerxette, Panarim, Naikawaddo, Castelwaddo, Carona, Lankdem, Panth, Corjuem and Calvim.

Demographics
, Aldona had a population of 6,320. Males constituted 46% of the population and females 54%. Pin Code of Aldona is 403508 which comes under Goa postal division (Goa-Panaji Region, Maharashtra Circle). The average literacy rate was 79%, higher than the national average of 59.5%. Among the literate, 49% were males and 51% were females. 9% of the population was under 7 years of age.

Aldona is one of the few, if not the only, village which has two comunidades (village communities, or ganvkaria). Following "endless fights for nearly four centuries, culminating in the comunidade's bifurcation into two bodies – Communidade Fraternal of the Brahmins (which included goldsmiths) and the Comunidade de Boa Esperanca of the Chardo (Kshatriya) and Sudra castes."

Government and politics
Aldona is part of Aldona (Goa Assembly constituency) and North Goa (Lok Sabha constituency).

Religion
Aldona is a multi-religious village where residents include mainly Christians, Hindus, and Muslims. In addition to the Catholic Church and several Chapels, there exist temples spread all over the village. 
The Catholic Church is dedicated to São Tomé (St. Thomas). The Chapels include those in the localities of Carona (St. Rita de Cascia), Quitula (Nosa Senhora de Piedade) and Corjuem (Mãe de Deus).

It has several wards (vadde), which include Quitula, Goncoi, Udoim, Coimavaddo (Voilo and Sokoilo), Carona, Santerxette, Khoirut, Castel Vaddo, Naikavaddo, Panarim, Maina Vaddo, Cottarbat, Soddo, Goddar, Panarim and Ranoi.

The Central part of Aldona is connected to Corjuem by a state-of-the-art cable-stayed bridge held by six cables from either direction.

The current Catholic Patriarch of the East Indies and Archbishop of Goa and Daman, India, Filipe Neri António Sebastião do Rosário Ferrão is from Aldona (born 20 January 1953 in Santerxette, Aldona, Goa, India)

St. Thomas Church
The St. Thomas Church remains an awe-inspiring presence in Aldona. It was built in 1596 on a high plateau on the banks of the Mapusa River, a tributary of the Mandovi River. A flight of broad steps cut into a cliff lead to an open plain that surrounds the grand white building.
The Feast of St. Thomas is celebrated each year on the second Saturday following Easter.

Inside, the Church is ornately decorated with symbolic biblical murals and grand statues. The treasures of the Church are the subject of a village legend. At one time, the statues of the church were strung with jewellery by villagers as thanks for prayers answered. However, it is said that the churches were often robbed of these jewels.

The Church buildings are white-washed in the tradition of Goan churches. The bandstand in the grounds and the cemetery are also white-washed.

The gate of the church graveyard has a sign in Konkani which reads "Aiz Maka, Falea Tuka", prominently displayed at the entrance, which translates into something akin to 'Today for me, tomorrow for you', a poignant reminder of our mortality.

Prominent landmarks

 St. Thomas Church
 Cemetery of the St. Thomas Church, Aldona
 Aldona comunidade(s): The village community. This comunidade village is believed to be at least 2000 years old.
 St Thomas High School. Founded in 1923. Currently run by the Fransalian Fathers
 Statue for educationist Professor Edward Soares erected at the Aldona market triangle.
 Cable-stayed bridge to Corjuem island
 Calvim bridge
 Stone bridge across Aldona backwaters
 Khorjuvem (Corjuem) fort with four wide ramps
 Cross marking the spot of the murder of Caitano Soares, en route to Ucassaim.
 State Bank of India, Aldona branch
 Bank of Baroda, Aldona branch, Goa
 HDFC BANK, Aldona branch, Goa
 CANARA BANK, Indian bank, Tamil Nadu

Notable people
 Alfred Rose, singer, tiatrist, melody king of Goa.
 Filipe Neri Ferrão, current archbishop of Goa and Daman.
 Anil Joseph Thomas Couto, Archbishop of the Roman Catholic Archdiocese of Delhi (2013–present).
 Joseph Coutts, archbishop of Karachi, since 2012.
 Fr. Gaspar Fernandes, O.F.M. Cap., Catholic capuchin priest serving in the Apostolic Vicariate of Northern Arabia
 Bernardo Elvino de Sousa, author of The Last Prabhu, a book on genetics and history of Goa and Aldona.
Alban Couto, IAS officer - first Development Commissioner of Goa after liberation.

Gallery

References

Villages in North Goa district